William Milne Moore (5 March 1917 – 4 February 2009) was an Australian rules footballer who played with Hawthorn in the Victorian Football League (VFL).

Milne also served in the Australian Army during World War II.

Notes

External links 

1917 births
2009 deaths
Australian rules footballers from Victoria (Australia)
Hawthorn Football Club players